Rebecca Reeve (born ) is an Australian female volleyball player. She is part of the Australia women's national volleyball team. 

She participated in the 2014 FIVB Volleyball World Grand Prix.
On club level she played for Blinn College in 2014.

References

External links
 Profile at FIVB.org

1994 births
Living people
Australian women's volleyball players
Place of birth missing (living people)
Tulsa Golden Hurricane women's volleyball players
Blinn College alumni
Wing spikers
Expatriate volleyball players in the United States
Australian expatriate sportspeople in the United States